Podravina (in Croatian) or Podravje (in Slovenian) are Slavic names for the Drava river basin in Croatia and Slovenia.

History

Between 1929 and 1941 a province of the Kingdom of Yugoslavia known as the Drava Banovina (Drava province) existed in the area with its capital in Ljubljana. The Drava Banovina comprised most of present-day Slovenia.

Today, one of the counties in Croatia is named Virovitica-Podravina, however the official capital of the region is the city of Koprivnica which is also the capital of Koprivnica-Križevci County.

Major cities and towns along the river

Cities and towns in Slovenia:
Dravograd
Maribor
Ptuj

Cities and towns in Croatia:
Varaždin
Koprivnica (Capital of Croatian Podravina) 
Đurđevac
Virovitica
Slatina
Osijek

The state route D2 connects all Croatian towns in Podravina.

See also
 Virovitica-Podravina County
 Koprivnica-Križevci County
 Varaždin County
 Drava Banovina

References

Sources
Podravina 

Regions of Croatia
Historical regions in Slovenia